is a Japanese swimmer. He competed in the men's 4 × 100 metre freestyle relay event at the 2016 Summer Olympics.

References

External links
 

1987 births
Living people
Olympic swimmers of Japan
Swimmers at the 2016 Summer Olympics
Place of birth missing (living people)
Japanese male freestyle swimmers
21st-century Japanese people